Freida Nicholls-Davy (born 13 March 1950) is a Barbadian sprinter. She competed in the women's 100 metres at the 1972 Summer Olympics. She also competed in the women's 200 metres at the 1976 Summer Olympics. Nicholls won a bronze medal in the 4 x 100 metres relay at the 1966 Central American and Caribbean Games.

References

1950 births
Living people
Athletes (track and field) at the 1972 Summer Olympics
Athletes (track and field) at the 1976 Summer Olympics
Barbadian female sprinters
Olympic athletes of Barbados
Athletes (track and field) at the 1975 Pan American Games
Athletes (track and field) at the 1978 Commonwealth Games
Commonwealth Games competitors for Barbados
Competitors at the 1966 Central American and Caribbean Games
Central American and Caribbean Games bronze medalists for Barbados
Place of birth missing (living people)
Central American and Caribbean Games medalists in athletics
Pan American Games competitors for Barbados
Olympic female sprinters